The World Geographic Reference System (GEOREF) is a geocode, a grid-based method of specifying locations on the surface of the Earth. GEOREF is essentially based on the geographic system of latitude and longitude, but using a simpler and more flexible notation. GEOREF was used primarily in aeronautical charts for air navigation, particularly in military or inter-service applications, but it is rarely seen today. However, GEOREF can be used with any map or chart that has latitude and longitude printed on it.

Quadrangles 

GEOREF is based on the standard system of latitude and longitude, but uses a simpler and more concise notation. GEOREF divides the Earth's surface into successively smaller quadrangles, with a notation system used to identify each quadrangle within its parent. Unlike latitude/longitude, GEOREF runs in one direction horizontally, east from the 180° meridian; and one direction vertically, north from the South Pole. GEOREF can easily be adapted to give co-ordinates with varying degrees of precision, using a 2–12 character geocode.

GEOREF co-ordinates are defined by successive divisions of the Earth's surface, as follows:

 The first level of GEOREF divides the world into quadrangles each measuring 15 degrees of longitude by 15 degrees of latitude; this results in 24 zones of longitude and 12 bands of latitude. A longitude zone is identified by a letter from A to Z (omitting I and O) starting at 180 degrees and progressing eastward through the full 360 degrees of longitude; a latitude band is identified by a letter from A through M (omitting I) northward from the south pole. Hence, any 15 degree quadrangle can be identified by two letters; the easting (longitude) is given first, followed by the northing (latitude). These two letters are the first two characters of a full GEOREF coordinate.
 Each 15-degree quadrangle is further divided into smaller quadrangles, measuring 1 degree of longitude by 1 degree of latitude. These quadrangles are lettered A to Q (omitting I and O), running from west to east for longitude; and A to Q (omitting I and O), running south to north for latitude. These letters form the third and fourth characters of a full GEOREF coordinate. Four letters thus identify any 1-degree quadrangle in the world.
 Each of the 1-degree quadrangles is further subdivided into 60 1-minute longitude zones, numbered 00 through 59 from west to east, and 60 1-minute latitude bands, numbered 00 to 59 from south to north. These numbers are always written as two digits, with a leading zero if necessary, and the easting is always followed by the northing. Thus, 4 letters and 4 digits give the position of any 1-minute quadrangle.
 Each of the 1-minute quadrangles may be further divided into 10 or 100 smaller divisions both north–south and east–west, permitting the identification of 0.1-minute or 0.01-minute quadrangles. The GEOREF coordinate for any 0.1-minute quadrangle consists of four letters and six numbers; the GEOREF coordinate for any 0.01-minute quadrangle consists of four letters and eight numbers.

The initial two letters of a GEOREF reference, designating the 15 degree quadrangle, can be omitted, if it is clear which 15 degree quadrangle the reference applies to (e.g., when working within a restricted geographical area).

Example 

For example, on a GEOREF chart, Naval Air Station Patuxent River (38°17′10″N   76°24′42″W) / (38.286108, -76.4291704) is located (to the nearest minute) at position GJPJ3417. 

To locate the position from the coordinates, proceed as follows:

 Right from 180° longitude to longitude zone G
 Up from the South Pole to latitude zone J
 Right in zone GJ to the lettered 1° column P
 Up in zone GJ to the lettered 1° row J
 Right in the 1° horizontal zone to 34 minutes
 Up in the 1° vertical zone to 17 minutes

The same co-ordinate shown in 6-digit (1/10 minute) format is GJPJ342171 and in 8-digit (1/100 minute) format is GJPJ34241716.

Designation of area 

Extensions to the above notation allow the GEOREF system to be used to designate an area around a reference point. This is achieved by adding an area designation to a base GEOREF co-ordinate. The area designation can be the letter S, to specify the sides of a rectangle (separated by the letter X); or the letter R, to specify the radius of a circle. In both cases the units are nautical miles. In addition, the letter H can be added, followed by an altitude in thousands of feet.

Designation GJPJ3716H17 means a height of 17,000 feet over GJPJ3716.

See also 
List of geodesic-geocoding systems
 Global Area Reference System (GARS)
 Maximum elevation figure correlated to each GEOREF quadrangle on VFR aviation maps
 Military Grid Reference System (MGRS)
 Area minimum altitudes on IFR charts

References 

 GEOREF info from map-reading.com
 World Geographic Reference System (GEOREF), National Geospatial-Intelligence Agency
 Coordinate Systems Overview, from the University of Colorado

Geocodes
Geographic coordinate systems
Military cartography